The events in India during 1970

Incumbents

Union Government 
 President of India – V. V. Giri
 Prime Minister of India – Indira Gandhi
 Chief Justice of India – Mohammad Hidayatullah (until 16 December), Jayantilal Chhotalal Shah (starting 17 December)

States: Governors
 Andhra Pradesh – Khandubhai Kasanji Desai 
 Assam – Braj Kumar Nehru 
 Bihar – Nityanand Kanungo 
 Gujarat – Shriman Narayan
 Haryana – Birendra Narayan Chakraborty 
 Jammu and Kashmir – Bhagwan Sahay 
 Karnataka – Gopal Swarup Pathak 
 Kerala – V. Viswanathan 
 Madhya Pradesh – K. Chengalaraya Reddy 
 Maharashtra – P V Cherian
 Meghalaya – Braj Kumar Nehru
 Nagaland – B.K. Nehru 
 Odisha – Shaukatullah Shah Ansari 
 Punjab – Dadappa Chintappa Pavate
 Rajasthan – Sardar Hukam Singh 
 Tamil Nadu – Sardar Ujjal Singh
 Uttar Pradesh – Bezawada Gopala Reddy 
 West Bengal – Shanti Swaroop Dhavan

Events
 National income - 468,169 million
 21 January - A state transport bus was torched by Communist Party of India (Marxist) workers at Chavassery, Kannur district killing four passengers.
 4 March – New Pimpri-Chinchwad Municipal Corporation formed in the state of Maharashtra
 7 September – Maharashtra Pollution Control Board is established under the provisions of Maharashtra Prevention of Water Pollution Act, 1969.
 17 September - 1970 Kerala Legislative Assembly election in which Communist Party of India and Indian National Congress contested as a United Front against a Communist Party of India (Marxist) led coalition were held.
 31 October - Mangalore Mail crashes into a stationary Cochin Mail at 8:10 p.m. (IST) at the Perambur station, Chennai, killing 16 and injuring 108.
 Bajaj Auto rolls out its 100,000th vehicle.

Births

January to June
29 January – Rajyavardhan Singh Rathore, politician and Olympic medalist
21 February – Karunas, comedian-actor.
21 March – Shobana, actress and dancer.
16 April – Mukesh Kumar, field hockey player.
26 April  Saranya Ponvannan, actress.
18 May  Rekha Josephine, actress.
1 June  R. Madhavan, actor.
19 June – Rahul Gandhi, Indian politician and leader of the Indian National Congress.

July to December
9 July – Neil Nongkynrih, pianist and conductor (d. 2022)
19 July – P. Amudha, IAS officer
22 July – Devendra Fadnavis, Politician, 18th chief minister of Maharashtra.
6 August – M. Night Shyamalan, Indian American writer -director.
16 August – 
Saif Ali Khan, actor.
Manisha Koirala, actress.

15 September  Ramya Krishnan, actress.
29 September  Khushbu, actress and politician.
10 October – Ali, actor.
17 October – Anil Kumble, cricketer.
27 November – Thirumal Valavan, field hockey player.
12 December – Cheran, director and actor.
20 December – Sohail Khan, actor, producer and director.
25 December – Rajesh Singh Adhikari, Indian military officer. (d. 1999)
28 December – Sajid Khan, actor.

Deaths
24 June – Sawai Man Singh II of Jaipur, last ruling Maharaja of Jaipur (b. 1911).
24 July – Peter de Noronha, businessman, philanthropist and civil servant (b. 1897).
21 November – C. V. Raman, physicist, awarded the 1930 Nobel Prize in Physics (b. 1888).

See also 
 Bollywood films of 1970

References

 
India
India
1970s in India
Years of the 20th century in India